The Joseph Schertz House is a historic house located on Illinois Route 116  west of Metamora, Illinois. Built in 1862 for area pioneer Joseph Schertz, the house is an example of a Greek Revival styled I-house. The two-story house is composed of a central hall and stairway with a room on either side on each floor, the typical I-house floor plan, and is topped by a side gabled roof. Key Greek Revival elements of the house include its six-over-six windows with stone sills and lintels and its frieze board and cornice below the roof.

The house was added to the National Register of Historic Places on April 20, 1995.

References

Houses on the National Register of Historic Places in Illinois
Greek Revival houses in Illinois
I-houses in Illinois
Houses completed in 1862
National Register of Historic Places in Woodford County, Illinois
Houses in Woodford County, Illinois
1862 establishments in Illinois